Stephen Gregory Yzerman (born May 9, 1965) is a Canadian former professional ice hockey player currently serving as executive vice president and general manager of the Detroit Red Wings, with whom he spent all 22 seasons of his NHL playing career. Widely regarded as one of the greatest players of all time, he is a Detroit sports icon and a member of the Hockey Hall of Fame. After his retirement as a player, he served in the front office of the Red Wings, and then as general manager of the Tampa Bay Lightning, while also being executive director for Team Canada in two Olympics.

Prior to the 1986–87 season, at age 21, Yzerman was named captain of the Red Wings and continuously served for the next two decades (dressing as captain for over 1,300 games), retiring as the longest-serving captain of any team in North American major league sports history. Once voted to be the most popular athlete in Detroit sports history, locals often simply refer to Yzerman as "Stevie Y", "Stevie Wonder", or "The Captain". Yzerman led the Wings to five first-place regular season finishes and three Stanley Cup championships (1997, 1998 and 2002).

Yzerman won numerous awards during his career, including the Lester B. Pearson Award (Most outstanding player) in the 1988–89 season, the Conn Smythe Trophy (Most Valuable Player of the Stanley Cup playoffs) in 1998, the Selke Trophy as the league's best defensive forward in 2000 and the Bill Masterton Memorial Trophy for perseverance in 2003. He played in ten All-Star Games, and was a first team All-Star in 2000 and a member of the All-Rookie Team in 1984.

On July 3, 2006, Yzerman officially retired from professional hockey, finishing his career ranked as the sixth all-time leading scorer in NHL history, having scored a career-high 155 points (65 goals and 90 assists) in 1988–89, which has been bettered only by Wayne Gretzky and Mario Lemieux. Yzerman's #19 jersey was retired on January 2, 2007, during a pre-game ceremony at Joe Louis Arena in Detroit. On November 4, 2008, he was inducted into the Canadian Sports Hall of Fame. He also became an honoured member of the Hockey Hall of Fame in 2009, his first year of eligibility, inducted alongside 2001–02 Red Wing teammates Brett Hull and Luc Robitaille. In 2017, Yzerman was named one of the "100 Greatest NHL Players" in history.

On September 25, 2006, Yzerman was named as a vice president and alternate governor of the Red Wings, winning a fourth Stanley Cup championship as an executive in 2007–08. In May 2010, he left the Red Wings organization to become general manager of the Tampa Bay Lightning, serving in that capacity until September 2018. On April 19, 2019, Yzerman was named the general manager of the Red Wings.

Yzerman has represented his country in several international tournaments as a member of Canada's national hockey team (Team Canada). In 2002, Yzerman won an Olympic gold medal, making him one of few players to win an Olympic gold medal and the Stanley Cup in the same year. Yzerman was the general manager of Team Canada for the 2007 IIHF World Championship, which they won. Yzerman was appointed executive director of Team Canada on October 7, 2008, for the 2010 Winter Olympics. Team Canada went on to win the gold medal by defeating the United States. Yzerman was again appointed executive director of Team Canada on March 5, 2012, for the 2014 Winter Olympics. Canada went on to win their second-straight gold medal after defeating Sweden.

Playing career

Early years in Detroit (1983–1986)
Yzerman was born in Cranbrook, British Columbia. As a youth, he played in the 1977 Quebec International Pee-Wee Hockey Tournament with a minor ice hockey team from Nepean, Ontario. He attended Bell High School and played for his hometown Nepean Raiders Junior A hockey team. After one season with the Raiders, the Peterborough Petes of the Ontario Hockey League (OHL) drafted him, and he played centre for the Petes from 1981 to 1983.

The 1983 NHL Entry Draft was the first for Mike and Marian Ilitch, who had purchased the Detroit Red Wings in the summer of 1982. Jim Devellano, the Red Wings' general manager at the time, wanted to draft Pat LaFontaine, who had grown up outside Detroit and played his junior hockey in the area. However, when the New York Islanders selected LaFontaine third overall, Devellano "settled" on Yzerman, drafting him fourth.

The Red Wings were prepared to send Yzerman back to Peterborough for one more year, but "after one (training camp) session, you knew he was a tremendous hockey player", said Ken Holland, the former Red Wings general manager who was then a minor league goaltender for the Wings during Yzerman's rookie training camp. Yzerman tallied 39 goals and 87 points in his rookie season and finished second in Calder Memorial Trophy voting. That season, Yzerman also became the first 18-year-old and youngest player to play in an NHL All-Star Game (18 years, 267 days) since the current format was adopted in 1969. This stood as an NHL record for 27 years until Jeff Skinner broke it by eight days.

Rise to stardom (1986–1996)
Following the departure of Red Wings captain Danny Gare during the 1985–86 season, Red Wings head coach Jacques Demers named Yzerman captain of the team on October 7, 1986, making him the youngest captain in the team's history. Demers said he "wanted a guy with the Red Wings crest tattooed on his chest". During the next season, Yzerman scored his then-career high 50th goal against the Buffalo Sabres on March 1, 1988. However, during the same game, Yzerman suffered a knee injury which caused him to miss the rest of the regular season. Despite his absence, the Red Wings would win their first division title in 23 years.

During the 1988–89 season, Yzerman recorded 155 points (65 goals and 90 assists), finishing third in regular season scoring behind Mario Lemieux and Wayne Gretzky. He won the Lester B. Pearson Award, the MVP as voted by the National Hockey League Players' Association, and was a finalist for the Hart Memorial Trophy, the MVP as voted by the NHL writers.

When Scotty Bowman took over as head coach in 1993, Yzerman initially chafed under Bowman's stern coaching style. Bowman, for his part, felt that Yzerman was not concentrating enough on defence; Bowman had long expected his forwards to be good back-checkers as well. Relations between the two became so strained that at one point, the Red Wings seriously considered trading him to the Ottawa Senators. However, Yzerman gradually became a better defender and was considered one of the best two-way forwards in the history of the game.

In 1995, Yzerman led Detroit to its first appearance in the Stanley Cup Finals since 1966, but the Red Wings were swept by the New Jersey Devils. The next season saw Detroit finish with an NHL-record 62 regular season wins and were heavily favoured to win the Stanley Cup. Yzerman scored perhaps the most memorable goal of his career in the 1996 playoffs, stealing the puck from Wayne Gretzky and beating St. Louis Blues goaltender Jon Casey with a slap shot from the blue line to win the Western Conference Semifinals in double overtime of Game 7. However, the Red Wings fell short of their ultimate goal, losing in six games to the Colorado Avalanche in the Western Conference Finals.

Stanley Cup titles (1996–2002)
In 1997, Yzerman put to rest all doubts of his ability to lead a team to a championship as Detroit won its first Stanley Cup in 42 years after sweeping the Philadelphia Flyers. The following year, Detroit repeated the feat, sweeping the Washington Capitals and winning their second consecutive Cup title. Yzerman earned the Conn Smythe Trophy as playoff MVP. He handed the Cup first to Vladimir Konstantinov, who had been severely injured in a car accident just six days after the Cup victory in 1997 and was using a wheelchair.

On November 26, 1999, Yzerman became the 11th player in NHL history to score 600 goals. In 2000, he made the NHL All-Star first team and won the Frank J. Selke Trophy as the league's top defensive forward.

In 2001–02, Yzerman re-aggravated a knee injury, forcing him to miss 30 regular season games, though nonetheless still finished sixth in team scoring. Yzerman's knee greatly pained him during the 2002 playoffs, but this did not stop him from leading the Red Wings from an early 2–0 deficit in their opening round series to defeat the Vancouver Canucks and St. Louis Blues en route to Detroit's fifth playoff series with Colorado, and the third time the two teams had battled to decide the Western Conference Championship. Detroit defeated Colorado in a seven-game series and moved on to the Stanley Cup Finals, where they defeated the Carolina Hurricanes to win their tenth Stanley Cup championship in their history. Rather than raising the Stanley Cup first, Yzerman passed the Cup to head coach Scotty Bowman, who announced his retirement following the game.

Final years (2003–2006)
During the offseason, Yzerman underwent a knee realignment surgery known as an osteotomy. He missed the first 61 games of the 2002–03 season, but returned on February 24, 2003, at home against the Los Angeles Kings. After the season, Yzerman won the Bill Masterton Memorial Trophy for perseverance.

On May 1, 2004, Yzerman was hit in the eye by a deflected slapshot by the Calgary Flames defenceman Rhett Warrener in a playoff game, breaking his orbital bone and scratching his cornea. Yzerman underwent eye surgery following the incident, and was sidelined for the remainder of the 2004 playoffs. The eye injury also forced Yzerman to miss the 2004 World Cup of Hockey. Joe Thornton (then of the Boston Bruins) and Joe Sakic (Colorado), who each wore the number 19 for their respective NHL clubs and who were now eligible to wear it for team Canada due to Yzerman's enforced absence, both refused the number out of respect for their injured countryman. Yzerman returned in the 2005–06 season, following the 2004–05 NHL lockout, wearing a visor.

On August 2, 2005, Yzerman signed a one-year deal with the Red Wings; this was his last contract signed as a player. On March 31, 2006, he scored his 691st NHL career goal, passing Mario Lemieux for eighth place all-time. Yzerman's humility was evident in an interview prior to his achievement when he was quoted saying, "I don't really know the significance. If anything, it shows how good [Lemieux] is; he played almost five years less than I did." He scored his final NHL goal, the 692nd of his career, on April 3, 2006, in a game against the Calgary Flames. Yzerman played his last professional hockey game on May 1, 2006, a loss to the Edmonton Oilers in Game 6 of the first round of the 2006 playoffs and knocking Detroit out of the playoffs.

On July 3, 2006, Yzerman announced his retirement from the NHL. Shortly afterwards, Sports Illustrated published a special commemorative edition dedicated to Yzerman entitled "Yzerman: A Salute to Stevie Y."

Yzerman holds the NHL record as the longest-serving captain of a single team – he spent 19 seasons and 1,303 games wearing the "C".  In addition to being eighth all-time in NHL regular-season goals and sixth in overall scoring, Yzerman finished his career seventh all-time in regular season assists and eighth in all-time playoff scoring. He also ranks second in nearly every significant offensive category in Red Wings history behind Gordie Howe, save for assists – Yzerman has 1,063 assists to Howe's 1,020. At the time of his retirement, only Howe (1,687 games) and Alex Delvecchio (1,550 games) had played more games as a Red Wing than Yzerman's 1,514. He is now fourth in games played for the franchise, behind Howe, Delvecchio, and Nicklas Lidström (1,564 games), who was his teammate for the final 12 seasons of his career.

Managerial career

Detroit Red Wings
On September 25, 2006, the Red Wings named Yzerman team vice-president and alternate governor.

On January 2, 2007, the Red Wings retired Yzerman's jersey #19 before a game against the Anaheim Ducks. As an additional honour, the captain's "C" was added to the corner of his banner to forever commemorate him as "The Captain". The official retirement ceremony was hosted by Yzerman's long-time friend, former NHL goaltender and ESPN hockey analyst Darren Pang, and featured such Red Wing luminaries as Gordie Howe, Ted Lindsay, Alex Delvecchio and Scotty Bowman. For the ceremony, active Red Wings players wore Yzerman throwback jerseys representing the Red Wings, Team Canada (Canada won gold at the 2002 Salt Lake City Winter Olympic Games), the Campbell Conference All-Star team and the Peterborough Petes. Former teammate Vladimir Konstantinov attended the ceremony, walking across the ice for the first time without a wheelchair since his last game in the 1997 playoffs.

On January 2, 2007, Yzerman was presented the key to the city of Detroit by Mayor Kwame Kilpatrick at a luncheon prior to the jersey retirement ceremony. On January 13, 2007, Governor of Michigan Jennifer Granholm, another Canadian–American, visited Detroit and the Joe Louis Arena and proclaimed the day as "Steve Yzerman Day" in Michigan.

On January 11, 2008, when the Red Wings visited Ottawa to play the Senators, Yzerman was inducted into the Ottawa Sports Hall of Fame. Yzerman received another honour when he was inducted into the Michigan Sports Hall of Fame on February 11, 2008.

On June 23, 2009, it was announced that Yzerman would be inducted into the Hockey Hall of Fame. He was honoured during the November 6–9 induction weekend alongside his former Red Wings teammates Brett Hull and Luc Robitaille, as well as Brian Leetch.

Yzerman had expressed his desire to run a team while with the Red Wings front office since the latter part of his playing career, and had gained experience in running a team through his work with Hockey Canada, having assembled several rosters between 2007 and 2010 for Hockey Canada. However, after both general manager Ken Holland and assistant general manager Jim Nill received contract extensions, it became clear that the opportunity would not happen with the Red Wings. It was later reported by The Detroit News in 2016 that Red Wings owner Mike Ilitch attempted to promote Holland to make room for Yzerman to become the team's general manager, but Holland declined the promotion.

Tampa Bay Lightning
Not long after Ken Holland received his contract extension, Craig Leipold, owner of the Minnesota Wild, and Jeffrey Vinik, the then-new owner of the Tampa Bay Lightning, sought to hire Yzerman as general manager. After turning down the Minnesota job before the 2009–10 season concluded, Yzerman accepted the Lightning job and was named the team's new vice-president and general manager on May 25, 2010. In the off-season, and early in his new reign, he re-signed Martin St. Louis, signed defenceman Pavel Kubina for his second tenure with the team, signed free agent goaltender Dan Ellis to a two-year contract, signed defenceman Brett Clark and brought in left-winger Simon Gagné in a trade that saw Matt Walker and a fourth-round pick in 2011 depart Tampa Bay. In the middle of the season, he also traded for goaltender Dwayne Roloson as the Lightning progressed to the Eastern Conference Finals just one year after the team had not even qualified for the 2010 playoffs. For his part, Yzerman was nominated for the NHL General Manager of the Year Award, losing out to Vancouver's Mike Gillis.

While the Lightning would miss the playoffs in each of the next two seasons, Yzerman would draft Nikita Kucherov, Andrei Vasilevskiy, Brayden Point, Ondrej Palat, Anthony Cirelli, and Callan Foote, signed undrafted players Tyler Johnson and Yanni Gourde, and acquire Ryan McDonagh, Mikhail Sergachev, Erik Cernak, Patrick Maroon, Kevin Shattenkirk, Curtis McElhinney and Jan Rutta via trades and contract offers as future cornerstone rosters. Soon, the team would reach the Stanley Cup Finals in 2015, where they were defeated by the Chicago Blackhawks. On June 24, 2015, Yzerman won the NHL General Manager of the Year Award; he was the first Lightning general manager to receive the honor. The team built by Yzerman set franchise records with 50 wins and 108 points during the regular season, and also led the league with 262 goals and 32 home wins.

In the 2017–18 season, the Lightning finished in first place in the Atlantic Division and made it to the Eastern Conference Finals before losing to the Washington Capitals. On September 11, 2018, with one year remaining on his contract, Yzerman announced that he would not be resigning as the Lightning general manager, but would remain with the team as a senior advisor. Yzerman was succeeded by assistant general manager Julien BriseBois.

Return to Detroit
On April 19, 2019, the Red Wings announced that Yzerman had been hired as general manager of the team, while the existing general manager, Ken Holland, was promoted to a senior vice president role, though Holland would soon depart the organization and become the general manager and president of hockey operations of the Edmonton Oilers.

Team Canada
On January 30, 2007, Hockey Canada named Yzerman the general manager of Team Canada for the 2007 IIHF World Championship in Moscow (April 27 – May 13), where the team beat Finland 4–2 on May 13 to win the Championship.

On October 18, 2008, Yzerman was named executive director for the Canadian men's hockey team at the 2010 Winter Olympics. The Canadian team he put together went on to win the gold, the first gold won by a home team in ice hockey since the 1980 USA Olympic hockey team. Yzerman said he would consider coming back as head of the Canadian team in 2014. Yzerman went on saying, "I loved it, but it was very stressful. Given the chance to represent Canada and be the guy in charge, if somebody offered it to me, I didn't hesitate the first time, I wouldn't hesitate again."

In 2012, Yzerman was named executive director for the Canadian men's hockey team at the 2014 Winter Olympics. The Canadian team he put together went on to win their second straight gold medal for the first time since 1948 and 1952. They also became the first country to accomplish the feat since the Soviet Union/Unified Team won three consecutive gold medals in 1984, 1988, and 1992. Following Canada's 3–0 victory over Sweden in the gold medal game, Yzerman announced that he would not return as the executive director for Canada for the 2018 Winter Olympics.

International play

Played for Canada in:

1983 World Junior Ice Hockey Championships
1984 Canada Cup
1985 World Ice Hockey Championships
1989 World Ice Hockey Championships
1990 World Ice Hockey Championships
1996 World Cup of Hockey
1998 Winter Olympics
2002 Winter Olympics

Yzerman was considered a leading candidate for the captaincy of Team Canada in 1998, along with Wayne Gretzky and Ray Bourque. Yzerman had led the Detroit Red Wings to the Stanley Cup during the previous season and was one of the longest-serving team captains. However, general manager Bobby Clarke instead selected Eric Lindros.

In late 2005, after Yzerman ruled himself out of a third Olympic appearance, Wayne Gretzky announced that no one would be allowed to wear jersey #19 for Canada for the 2006 Olympics in Yzerman's honour (#19 was later "unretired" by Yzerman when he managed Team Canada for the 2010 Olympics).

Personal life
Yzerman and his wife Lisa Brennan have three daughters. They reside in Bloomfield Hills, Michigan. Yzerman resided in Hillsborough County, Florida during his tenure with the Lightning. Yzerman has acquired naturalized United States' citizenship as a result of his many years of residence in Michigan.

Not far from where Yzerman grew up, the Nepean Sportsplex named one of its indoor ice surfaces the Steve Yzerman Arena in 1997 in his honour. This is the home rink of the CCHL's Nepean Raiders, the Tier II Junior "A" team Yzerman played on during the 1980–81 season. The Raiders currently play in the Yzerman Division.

The CCHL divisions are named the Robinson and Yzerman Divisions after two of its most prominent alumni, Yzerman and Larry Robinson.

Career statistics

Regular season and playoffs

International

Awards and achievements

 NHL All-Star Game Roster – 1984 (first 18-year old to be selected to the roster), 1988, 1989, 1990, 1991, 1992, 1993, 1997, 1999, 2000;
 NHL first team All-Star – 2000;
 Lester B. Pearson Award – 1989;
 Conn Smythe Trophy – 1998;
 Frank J. Selke Trophy – 2000;
 Stanley Cup champion (as player) – 1997, 1998, 2002;
 Stanley Cup champion (as executive) – 2008;
 Bill Masterton Memorial Trophy – 2003;
 Lester Patrick Trophy – 2006;
 Seventh in NHL history in points, tenth in goals and ninth in assists;
 First in Red Wings history in assists; second in points and goals; fourth in games played; second all-time in seasons and seventh all-time in games played with only one NHL franchise;
 Longest-serving captain for a team in league history (19 seasons, 1,303 games);
 Number (19) retired with Canadian Men's National Team; (#19 later worn at the 2010 Vancouver Olympics by Joe Thornton)
 Named vice-president of Detroit Red Wings – 2006;
 Detroit Red Wings #19 retired on January 2, 2007;
 Named general manager of Team Canada – 2008;
 Was ranked sixth in The Hockey News "The Top 60 Since 1967 – The Best Players of the Post Expansion Era";
 Inducted into Ottawa Sports Hall of Fame – January 11, 2008;
 Inducted into the Michigan Sports Hall of Fame – February 11, 2008;
 Inducted into Canada's Sports Hall of Fame – 2008;
 Inducted into the Hockey Hall of Fame – 2009;
 Named general manager and vice-president of the Tampa Bay Lightning – May 2010;
 Inducted into the IIHF Hall of Fame – 2014;
 Named to the Order of Hockey in Canada by Hockey Canada – 2014;
 NHL General Manager of the Year Award – 2015;
 Named on the 100 Greatest NHL Players list for the NHL's Centennial Anniversary – 2017;
 Named general manager and executive vice-president of the Detroit Red Wings – April 2019

See also
List of NHL statistical leaders
Captain (ice hockey)
List of NHL players with 1,000 points
List of NHL players with 500 goals
List of NHL players with 1,000 games played
List of NHL players who spent their entire career with one franchise

References

Further reading

External links
 
 
 
 
 

1965 births
Living people
Bill Masterton Memorial Trophy winners
Canadian emigrants to the United States
Canadian expatriate ice hockey players in the United States
Canadian ice hockey centres
Canadian people of Dutch descent
Conn Smythe Trophy winners
Detroit Red Wings captains
Detroit Red Wings draft picks
Detroit Red Wings executives
Detroit Red Wings players
Frank Selke Trophy winners
Hockey Hall of Fame inductees
Ice hockey people from British Columbia
Ice hockey players at the 1998 Winter Olympics
Ice hockey players at the 2002 Winter Olympics
IIHF Hall of Fame inductees
Lester B. Pearson Award winners
Lester Patrick Trophy recipients
Medalists at the 2002 Winter Olympics
National Hockey League All-Stars
National Hockey League executives
National Hockey League first-round draft picks
National Hockey League players with retired numbers
Nepean Raiders players
Olympic gold medalists for Canada
Olympic ice hockey players of Canada
Olympic medalists in ice hockey
Order of Hockey in Canada recipients
Peterborough Petes (ice hockey) players
Sportspeople from Cranbrook, British Columbia
Ice hockey people from Detroit
Stanley Cup champions
Tampa Bay Lightning executives